Onthophagus pennsylvanicus is a species of dung beetle in the family Scarabaeidae. It is found in North America.

References

Further reading

 

Scarabaeinae
Articles created by Qbugbot
Beetles described in 1871